The 3R's is an album by trumpeter Red Rodney with saxophonists Richie Cole and Ricky Ford which was recorded in 1979 and released on the Muse label in 1982.

Reception

The AllMusic review by Scott Yanow stated "Excellent straight-ahead performances, with all of the musicians in fine form".

Track listing
 "The Mack Man" (Red Rodney, Gerry LaFurn) – 7:41
 "For Heaven's Sake" (Sherman Edwards, Donald Meyer, Elise Bretton) – 4:31
 "Dead End" (Kenny Dorham) – 6:55
 "Waiting For Waits" (Richie Cole) – 5:55
 "Samba de Vida" (Jack Walrath) – 7:05
 "Blueport" (Art Farmer) – 4:49

Personnel
Red Rodney – trumpet
Richie Cole - alto saxophone
Ricky Ford – tenor saxophone (tracks 1, 2 & 4)
Turk Mauro - tenor saxophone, baritone saxophone
Roland Hanna – keyboards
George Duvivier – bass
Grady Tate – drums

References

Muse Records albums
Red Rodney albums
1982 albums
Albums produced by Bob Porter (record producer)